Techno Games is a robot competition television programme that aired on BBC Two from 20 March 2000 to 28 March 2003. It is a spin-off from the hugely successful Robot Wars.

Format
Schools, colleges, individuals and technology clubs competed to break world records, win medals and the grand series prize. For most events lifelike movement was required, so, for example, in the swimming event propellers were banned in favour of legs, paddles, flippers and fins.

Events
Not all the events appeared in all of the series.

Assault Course
Cycling
Football (previously appeared on Robot Wars)
Gymnastics
High Jump
Long Jump
Micromouse (Wall following)
Micromouse (Maze solving)
Relay Cars
Rocket Cars and Funny Cars
Solar Challenge Cars
Tug-of-War (previously appeared on Robot Wars)
Rocketry (Spot landing and Egg Protection)
Rope Climbing (Natural movement-arms and legs)
Rope Climbing (Artificial movement-wheels and rollers)
Sprint (Two, three, four, six and eight legged walkers)
Sumo (previously appeared on Robot Wars)
Swimming
Water Polo
Outdoor Events (Penalty kick, Shot Put)

Transmissions

References

External links

Martin Smith's Techno Games website
What is Techno Games?
Techno Games, Rules and Guidelines 2000
Skeletron, The Rope Climbing Robot

2000 British television series debuts
2003 British television series endings
BBC television game shows
2000s British game shows
Robot Wars (TV series)
Robot combat competitions
Robotics competitions
Robotics in the United Kingdom
Television series about robots
Sports entertainment
Tinopolis